Songköl Too (Kyrgyz: Соңкөл тоосу) is a range in the Internal Tien-Shan that arcuately frames Songköl Valley from the north and separates Songköl Valley with Song Kol Lake from Jumgal Valley, and Telek Valley. It is located in Jumgal and Kochkor districts of Naryn Region. Difference in elevation between Songköl Too and Songköl Valley - , and between Songköl Too and Jumgal Valley - . Picks are gentle in the western part of the range and rocky - in the eastern. The northern slopes are steep and sharply rugged, and southern ones are gentle. The range is composed by majorly limestone.

References

Mountain ranges of Kyrgyzstan
Naryn Region
Mountain ranges of the Tian Shan